Bakmeegolla is a village located in Kurunegala District of Sri Lanka, 10 km from Kurunegala, which is the capital city of the North Western Province.

Maps
Detailed map of Bakmeegolla vicinity and Sri Lanka

Populated places in North Western Province, Sri Lanka